William Leech PLC was a major Tyneside housebuilder.

History
The company was established by William Leech, a former window cleaner in 1934 as William Leech (Builders) Ltd. It bought very large landholdings in the Cramlington area and was first listed on the London Stock Exchange in 1976 when its name was changed to William Leech PLC. It achieved an output of 2,500 units in 1979. It announced a merger with Bellway in 1981 but this was called off within days: "the lifestyle of the two firms looked pretty incompatible". The company was then acquired by Beazer in 1985.

References

Sources

Housebuilding companies of the United Kingdom